William Daley (born February 21, 1962) better known by his ring name Billy Silverman, is a professional wrestling referee who worked for World Championship Wrestling and the World Wrestling Federation and later World Wrestling Entertainment.

Professional wrestling career
Silverman started with the WWF in 1986 and worked there until 1997.  Soon after his departure from the WWF, he signed with World Championship Wrestling.  He stayed with WCW until the company was purchased by Vince McMahon and the WWE in March 2001.
He returned to the World Wrestling Entertainment  and became a member of The Alliance.

Silverman appeared in the 2000 movie Ready to Rumble and the 2003 movie  Mystic River.

Awards and honors
Cauliflower Alley Club
Charlie Smith Referee’s Award (2022)
New England Pro Wrestling Hall of Fame
Class of 2014

References

Professional wrestling referees
1962 births
Living people
Sportspeople from Auburn, Maine
Sportspeople from Bradenton, Florida